Franklin Mills could refer to:
 Kent, Ohio, formerly called Franklin Mills
 Philadelphia Mills, formerly referred to as Franklin Mills Mall